Dismorphia lewyi is a butterfly in the family Pieridae first described by Hippolyte Lucas in 1852. It is found from Venezuela to Bolivia.

Subspecies
The following subspecies are recognised:
Dismorphia lewyi lewyi (Colombia)
Dismorphia lewyi nasua (C. Felder & R. Felder, 1861) (Venezuela)
Dismorphia lewyi leonora (Hewitson, 1869) (Ecuador)
Dismorphia lewyi boliviensis Röber, 1909 (Bolivia)
Dismorphia lewyi dolorita Fassl, 1910 (Colombia)
Dismorphia lewyi rebecca Lamas, 2004 (Peru)

References

Dismorphiinae
Butterflies described in 1852
Pieridae of South America